Shamli is a city and the headquarters of Shamli district, in the Indian state of Uttar Pradesh. It is a part of Delhi NCR and is an administrative subdivision under Saharanpur division.

History
According to the mythological story, in Dawpar yug Lord Krishana passed through the city before proceeding towards Kurukshetra from Hastinapur and in his way he took a quick pit stop under the trees of Barne located at Hanuman Tilla (Hanuman Dham) Shamli and drank some water from the nearby well. later on, signs of Baba Bajrang Bali (Lord Hanuman) Blessed this Holy place which was known as “Shyamvali” previously and then got its name changed to “Shyama Nagri” which eventually came to be known as Shamli. According to some stories, the town was founded by Kunti's son Bheem Sen.

It is considered to be a very important place as the bank to Indian culture and freedom movement. According to available pieces of evidence, Maratha warriors developed it as a Cantonment area  and later used it as a Garrison as it was considered one of the safest places to hide from the Britishers during the Independence Movement. During British Raj, freedom fighters burned the “Purani Teshil” and started the 1857 Kranti and sacrificed themselves. As a consequence of their action, the town was stripped of its administrative importance.

Recent History
Shamli was declared as a district in September 2011 and was named Prabuddh Nagar by then Chief Minister of Uttar Pradesh Ms Mayawati. In July 2012, the district was renamed Shamli by Akhilesh Yadav, who became Chief Minister in 2012.

Location
The city is part of the Delhi National Capital Region (NCR). It is located along the following-
 Delhi-Saharanpur-Dehradun Expressway
 Ambala-Shamli Expressway
 Gorakhpur-Shamli Expressway
 Delhi–Saharanpur (709B), 
 Meerut-Karnal (709A) and 
 Panipat-Khatima (709AD) Highways.

Geography

Demographics

Provisional data from the 2011 census shows that Shamli has a population of 107,233, of which 57,236 are male and 49,997 are female. The literacy rate is 82.97 per cent. Shamli is declared as the first ODF (Open Defecation Free) district of Uttar Pradesh, made by the leading efforts of DM Sujeet Kumar.

Notable Personalities

Arvind Sangal is a educationist, social worker and philanthropist. From 2012 to 2017, he was the chairperson of the municipality.

Transport
Shamli has a very poor public transport connectivity. There are multiple unreserved trains run from Delhi to Shamli, but these trains run overloaded. There is no night bus service available from Shamli to any city.

References

External links
Uttar Pradesh Assembly Elections
Shamli Assembly Elections

Cities and towns in Shamli district
Cities in Uttar Pradesh
Shamli